The Carrera Autopodistica is an annual human-powered land vehicle racing competition that takes place in September in Castel San Pietro Terme near Bologna, Italy. The vehicles involved are unique, soapbox-like cars driven by a pilot and propelled by "spingitori", or pushing men.
Every year this competition attracts not only local people but also foreigners, and recently the peculiarity of the race has caught the attention of national television networks -private and public-, increasing the visibility of Castel San Pietro Terme.

History 
The race is the central happening of Settembre Castellano, a series of cultural, sports, and gastronomic events, which have their climax every year on the second Sunday of September with the Sagra Castellana della Braciola (the sheep chop fair), which has been running since 1951. The Carrera Autopodistica has been running since 1954.

Over the last half-century, technological and sporting innovations have improved race performances. We went from the wood or iron made cars made in the '50s, to the carbon fiber and titanium cars we have nowadays. Teams work the whole year to build sophisticated cars, improving smoothness on downhill roads and flat ground, and decreasing vehicle weight for helping the athletes with less weight to push.

Races 
There are two competitions every year, held in the same day. The Coppa Terme, spanning a distance of 1,600 metres, starts at the beginning of Viale delle Terme and ends at the entrance of the spa building.
The Carrera Autopodistica is the main event, taking place in the historical town center. Start and finish line is located in Piazza XX Settembre. The race consists in two laps of the urban track, each one is 1,250 meters.
Another competition, which takes place in May, anticipating the Carrera Autopodistica of September, is the so-called Carrera dei Piccoli or “Baby Carrera”, run by young people (under 15) on the same track of the Carrera Autopodistica.

Rules 
Four pushing men ("spingitori") and a pilot take part in the races.
The pushing men swap running and pushing the car, like in a relay race, where the baton is the car. The competition rules allow only one person to push the car at a time. On the downhill part of the track ("la bassa"), where the car increases its speed, the pusher jumps in the car behind the driver and then resumes pushing when the car speed reduces.

Programme 
Every year the program traditionally schedules the time trials on the first Sunday of September, which decide the starting grid.
On the second Sunday of September, the Coppa Terme and Carrera Autopodistica races take place.

Race results "Trofeo Maurizio Ragazzi" 
2013

2014

2015

2016

2017

2018

2019

2020
The edition was canceled due to Covid-19.

2021

Gallery

References

External links 
 Castel San Pietro Terme Official site
 Team Ov
 Team Nera
 Club Carrera Association Official site
 Team squalo

Culture in Emilia-Romagna
Tourist attractions in Emilia-Romagna
Sport in Castel San Pietro Terme
Human-powered vehicles